Benjamin Karpman (August 8, 1886 – May 24, 1962) was an American psychiatrist known for his work on human sexuality. He served as Professor and Head of Psychiatry at Howard University College of Medicine from 1921 to 1941.

Life and career

Karpman was born in Slutzk, Belarus. He graduated from the University of Minnesota, earning a bachelor's degree in 1915, a master's degree in 1918, and a Doctor of Medicine degree in 1920. While at University of Minnesota Medical School, he worked with Jesse Francis McClendon on pioneering in situ pH measurements in the human digestive tract. After completing his internship at St. Elizabeths Hospital, he rose to the position of Senior Medical Officer and Psychotherapist. Karpman was a proponent of psychoanalysis and published many case reports based on his clinical experience. At Howard, he introduced dynamic psychiatry into the medical curriculum.

Karpman was a contributor to The American Mercury, where he was critical of the Harrison Narcotics Tax Act. He was elected to the New York Academy of Sciences in 1953. Karpman was critical of both law and medicine in their treatment of social problems. He predicted that by 2010 the U.S. would have no prisons, just psychiatric treatment centers for lawbreakers. "I am at odds with the legal profession and most of psychiatry," he conceded, "but they're all wrong. The question is simply, 'Is the accused sick or not?' You can't have mental illness and criminal responsibility in the same person at the same time."

Karpman had a heart attack on May 23, 1962, and died the next day at the age of 75.

Selected publications

Woodrow H, Karpman B (1917). A new olfactoric technique and some results.  Journal of Experimental Psychology Volume 2, Issue 6, December 1917, Pages 431-447 
McClendon JF, Sheldon A, Karpman B (1918). The hydrogen ion concentrations of the contents of the small intestine. Journal of Biological Chemistry, Feb 19, 1918. XXXIV, No 1.
Karpman B (1933). Case studies in the psychopathology of crime, Volume 1. Mimeoform Press
Karpman B (1935). The individual criminal: studies in the psychogenetics of crime, Volume 1. Nervous and Mental Disease Pub. Co.
Karpman B, Washington MD (1936). The individual criminal. The British Medical Journal Vol. 2, No. 3952 (Oct. 3, 1936), p. 676
Karpman B (1941). On the need of separating psychopathy into two distinct clinical types: the symptomatic and the idiopathic. Journal of Criminal Psychopathology 3, 112-137.
Karpman B (1946). Psychopathy in the scheme of human typology. Journal of Nervous and Mental Disease, Volume 103 - Issue 3 - ppg 276-288
Karpman B (1946). Felonious assault revealed as a symptom of abnormal sexuality; a contribution to the psychogenesis of psychopathic behavior. J Crim Law Criminol 1946 Sep-Oct;37(3):193-215. 
Karpman B (1947).  Dream Life in A Case of Transvestism: With Particular Attention To the Problem of Latent Homosexuality. Journal of Nervous & Mental Disease September 1947 - Volume 106 - Issue 3 - ppg 292-337. 
Karpman B (1947).  Passive parasitic psychopathy: toward the personality structure and psychogenesis of idiopathic psychopathy (anethopathy). Psychoanal Rev. 1947 Apr;34(2):198 
Karpman B (1947).  Moral agenesis. Psychiatr Q. 1947 Jul;21(3):361-98. 
Karpman B (1947). An attempt at a re-evaluation of some concepts of law and psychiatry. Reprint J Crim Law Criminol (1931). 1947 Sep-Oct;38(3):206-17.  
Karpman B (1947). A psychiatrist looks at the social scientists. Am J Sociol. 1947 Sep;53(2):131-40. 
Karpman B (1949). Objective psychotherapy: principles, methods, and results. Journal of Clinical Psychology Jul;5(3):193-342. 
Karpman B (1949). Case Lying; a minor inquiry into the ethics of neurotic and psychopathic behavior. Reprint J Crim Law Criminol 1949 Jul-Aug;40(2):135-57. 
Karpman B (1948). Emotional background of white slavery; toward the psychogenesis of so-called psychopathic behavior. J Crim Law Criminol 1948 May-Jun;39(1):1-18. 
Karpman B (1948). Sex life in prison. Journal of Criminal Law and Criminology Jan-1948 Feb;38(5):475-86. 
Karpman B (1948). Criminal psychopathology; a brief inventory. Prog Neurol Psychiatry. 1948;3:451-68. 
Karpman B (1948). Conscience in the psychopath: Another version. American Journal of Orthopsychiatry Jul;18(3):455-91.  
Karpman B (1948). The alcoholic woman: case studies in the psychodynamics of alcoholism. Linacre Press ASIN B000RTFUBS
Karpman B (1948). The myth of the psychopathic personality. American Journal of Psychiatry Mar;104(9):523-34. 
Karpman B (1948). Coprophilia; a collective review. Psychoanal Rev. 1948 Jul;35(3):253-72. 
Karpman B (1948). The psychopathology of exhibitionism; review of the literature. J Clin Exp Psychopathol. 1948 Apr;9(2):179-225. 
Karpman B (1949). Criminality, insanity and the law. 'reprint 1949 'Journal of Criminal Law and Criminology Jan-Feb;39(5):584-605. 
Karpman B (1949). Symposium on psychopathology. Archives of Criminal Psychodynamics
Karpman B (1949). The principles and methods of objective psychotherapy. J Clin Psychol. 2000 Jul;56(7):877-87. 
Karpman B (1949). From the autobiography of a liar; toward the clarification of the problem of psychopathic states. Psychiatr Q. 1949 Apr;23(2):277; passim. 
Karpman B (1949).  A modern Gulliver; a study in coprophilia. Psychoanal Rev. 1949 Jul;36(3):260; passim. 
Karpman B, Lurie LA, Lippman HS, Lourie RS, Rabinovitch RD, Allen FH, Spitz RA, Anderson VV (1950).  The psychopathic delinquent child; Round Table, 1949. Am J Orthopsychiatry. 1950 Apr;20(2):223-65. 
Karpman B (1950).  A case of paedophilia (legally rape) cured by psychoanalysis. Psychoanal Rev. 1950 Jul;37(3):235-76. 
Karpman B (1950).  Aggression. Am J Orthopsychiatry. 1950 Oct;20(4):694-718. 
Karpman B (1951).  Psychosis with psychopathic personality: an untenable diagnosis. Psychiatr Q. 1951 Oct;25(4):618-40. 
Karpman B (1951).  The sexual psychopath. J Am Med Assoc. 1951 Jun 23;146(8):721-6. 
Karpman B (1951).  The sexual psychopath. Discussion. Am J Psychother. 1951 Oct;5(4):584-605. 
Karpman B (1951).  A psychoanalytic study of a fraternal twin. Am J Orthopsychiatry. 1951 Oct;21(4):735-55. 
Karpman B (1951).  A psychoanalytic study of a case of murder. Psychoanal Rev. 1951 Jul;38(3):245-70. 
Karpman B (1952).  Insecurity in search of security. Am J Psychother. 1952 Jan;6(1):23-43. 
Karpman B (1952).  Dramanalysis. Am J Orthopsychiatry. 1952 Jul;22(3):570-83. 
Karpman B (1952).  The psychonomic principle in human behavior. Psychoanal Rev. 1952 Apr;39(2):168-86. 
Karpman B (1953).  Dream life in a case of hebephrenia. Psychiatr Q. 1953 Apr;27(2):262-316. 
Karpman B (1953).  Psychodynamics in a fraternal twinship relations. Psychoanal Rev. 1953 Jul;40(3):243-67. 
Karpman B (1953).  Psychogenic (hysterical) dysphagia; report of a case. Am J Orthopsychiatry. 1953 Jul;23(3):472-500. 
Karpman B (1954). A case of fulminating pyromania. J Nerv Ment Dis. 1954 Mar;119(3):205-32. 
Karpman B (1955). The hangover; a critical study in the psychodynamics of alcoholism Thomas, ASIN B000IB76C6
Karpman B (1955).  Dream life in a case of pyromania. Psychoanal Rev. 1955 Jan;42(1):44-60. 
Karpman B (1956). Criminal Psychodynamics. A Platform.  The Journal of Criminal Law, Criminology, and Police Vol. 47, No. 1 (May - Jun., 1956), pp. 8–17
Karpman B (1959). Symposia on child and juvenile delinquency: presented at the American Orthopsychiatric Association. J Am Med Assoc. 1959;171(5):624-625.
Karpman B (1961). The structure of neurosis: With special differentials between neurosis, psychosis, homosexuality, alcoholism, psychopathy, and criminality. Archives of Criminal Psychodynamics. 4, 599-646.
Karpman B (1964). The sexual offender and his offenses: etiology, pathology, psychodynamics, and treatment. Julian Press, ASIN B0007HAB2I

References

1886 births
1962 deaths
People from Slutsk
People from Slutsky Uyezd
Belarusian Jews
Emigrants from the Russian Empire to the United States
American people of Belarusian-Jewish descent
University of Minnesota Medical School alumni